Gina Grant (born 1976) is an American woman who gained notoriety when her admission to Harvard College was rescinded after it became known that several years earlier, at age 14, she had killed her mother. Controversy ensued over questions including whether she was obligated to disclose crimes committed as a juvenile; whether she had escaped justice for the killing; and whether the decisions, made by Harvard and several other universities that reconsidered her admission in the wake of the revelations, were justified.

Background
Gina Grant was the daughter of Charles Grant and Dorothy Mayfield, both of whom lived in Lexington, South Carolina. She had one sister, her elder by nine years. Gina's father died of lung cancer when Gina was 11 years old.

Mother's killing
At the time of her crime in 1990, Grant was a juvenile so as per the law pertaining to minors, the criminal records are sealed. However, the Lexington County sheriff, James Mettswho handled the original casereleased Grant's name immediately after her arrest. Thus, the facts of the case are available in copious newspaper and magazine articles published in the early 1990s.

On September 13, 1990, in Lexington, South Carolina, the 14-year-old Grant bludgeoned her mother 13 times with a crystal candlestick, crushing her skull. She mopped up pools of blood from the kitchen floor and hid the candlestick and bloody rags in a closet. She then tried to make the death look like suicide by sticking a carving knife into the side of her mother's neck, and wrapping her mother's fingers around the handle.

Grant changed her story several times. Initially, she told police that her mother attacked her while holding a knife and then stabbed herself in the throat. When the candlestick was discovered, Grant changed her story, eventually telling the police that she had committed the killing in self-defense. She was charged with murder.

In mitigation, evidence suggested that Grant's mother was an alcoholic. Gina claimed that her mother had been physically abusive, to which Gina's sister attested. Grant pleaded no contest to voluntary manslaughter and was sentenced to a year in juvenile detention, with probation until age 18. Her boyfriend pleaded no contest to being an accessory to voluntary manslaughter after the fact and served nearly a year in juvenile detention.

Grant was given permission by the juvenile court to relocate to Cambridge, Massachusetts, to live with a paternal aunt and uncle. She began attending Cambridge Rindge and Latin High School in 1992, where she excelled academically, tutored impoverished children, and was co-captain of the tennis team.

Admissions revocations
In January 1995 Grant was admitted to Harvard University, reportedly having told her Harvard interviewer that her mother had been killed in an accident. After she was featured in an April 2 Boston Globe article about students who had overcome difficult circumstances, Harvard and The Globe received anonymous communications containing old news articles about Grant's mother's death. Harvard rescinded Grant's admission the next day, referring only to a list of general reasons that admissions are sometimes rescinded. Harvard refused Grant's request to meet with the admissions committee.

Grant, through a lawyer, argued that educational institutions are forbidden by Massachusetts law to ask about criminal matters not resulting in "convictions"juveniles are "adjudicated delinquent" rather than "convicted"and that she was not obliged to disclose an event that occurred when she was a juvenile and reflected only in her sealed juvenile record.

Some campus publications sided with Grant, citing her mother's alcoholism and Grant's allegations of physical abuse. An editorial in The New York Times, an article in the Chicago Tribune,
and Harvard Law professors Charles Ogletree and Alan Dershowitz also criticized Harvard's action.

Columbia University and Barnard College also rescinded acceptances they had extended to Grant, but Tufts University allowed their acceptance of her to stand, and Grant entered Tufts as part of the Class of 1999.

References

University and college admissions
Harvard University
1995 in Massachusetts
1995 controversies
Cambridge Rindge and Latin School alumni